Mbulelo Wagaba (born 27 November 1996) is a South African footballer who plays as a winger for Cape Town Spurs in the National First Division.

Career

Polokwane City
A graduate of the club's youth academy, Wagaba made his league debut for the club on 7 August 2018, tallying 62 minutes before being replaced by Walter Musona in a 2–0 home defeat to Mamelodi Sundowns.

References

External links
Mbulelo Wagaba at Sofa Score

1996 births
Living people
South African soccer players
Association football forwards
Polokwane City F.C. players
TS Sporting F.C. players
Cape Town Spurs F.C. players
South African Premier Division players
National First Division players